The 2018 Cyprus Cup was the eleventh edition of the Cyprus Cup, an invitational women's football tournament held annually in Cyprus. It took place from 28 February to 7 March 2018.

Spain won the title for the first time after defeating Italy 2–0 in the final.

Format
The twelve invited teams were split into three groups to play a round-robin tournament.

Points awarded in the group stage follow the standard formula of three points for a win, one point for a draw and zero points for a loss. In the case of two teams being tied on the same number of points in a group, their head-to-head result determine the higher place.

1st place match: Winners of Groups A and B.
3rd place match: Winner of Group C and best runner-up from Groups A and B.
5th place match: Runner-up in Group C and second-best runner-up from Groups A and B.
7th place match: Third-place teams in Groups A and B.
9th place match: Third-place team in Group C and best fourth-place team from Groups A and B.
11th place match: Fourth-place team in Group C and second-best fourth-place team from Groups A and B.

Venues

Teams

Squads

Group stage
The groups and schedule were announced on 18 January 2018.

Group A

Group B

Group C

Placement matches

Eleventh place game

Ninth place game

Seventh place game

Fifth place game

Third place game

Final

Final standings

Goalscorers
3 goals

 Tereza Kožárová
 Emmi Alanen
 Cristiana Girelli
 Kim Yun-mi

2 goals

 Laura Feiersinger
 Kateřina Svitková
 Kayleigh Green

1 goal

 Sarah Puntigam
 Jana Coryn
 Tine De Caigny
 Heleen Jaques
 Nicky Van Den Abbeele
 Tessa Wullaert
 Aneta Dědinová
 Tereza Szewieczková
 Olga Ahtinen
 Zsanett Jakabfi
 Greta Adami
 Valentina Bergamaschi
 Barbara Bonansea
 Valentina Giacinti
 Manuela Giugliano
 Kim Phyong-hwa
 Yu Jong-hui
 Patrícia Fischerová
 Patrícia Hmírová
 Ľudmila Maťavková
 Thembi Kgatlana
 Noko Matlou
 Olga García
 Patricia Guijarro
 Irene Paredes
 Alexia Putellas
 Amanda Sampedro
 Mari Paz Vilas
 Vanessa Bernauer
 Ana-Maria Crnogorčević
 Alisha Lehmann
 Rachel Rinast
 Marilena Widmer

References

External links
Official website

2018
2018 in women's association football
2017–18 in Cypriot football
Cyprus Women's Cup
Cyprus Women's Cup